Josef Klant (8 December 1869 – 7 September 1927) was an early member of the Nazi Party and served as the first Gauleiter of Hamburg.

Early life
After attending elementary school, he worked in the mining industry from 1883 to 1886. Then he moved to Hamburg and became a clerk at Blohm+Voss, a shipbuilding company. In 1899, now a travel agent for his employer, he was granted citizenship in Hamburg. In 1903 he bought a cigar business which he ran until his death. Drawn to right wing and conservative political views, he became a member of the German Socialist Party, and later the German National People’s Party. He was also a member of the Deutschvölkischer Schutz- und Trutzbund, the most active, and most influential anti-Semitic federation in the Weimar Republic.

In July 1922, he joined the Nazi Party and became chairman of the local Nazi association. When the Party was banned in the wake of the Beer Hall Putsch, he remained a tireless organizer and founded several cover associations which were quickly banned as well. In 1923 and 1924 he remained active as a speaker at several mass meetings. The Hamburg association was last reorganized under the name the Blücher Group, and in February 1924 Klant was sentenced to 4 months in prison and a 500 Reichsmark fine for his continued illegal activities on its behalf. In October 1924 he was elected to the Hamburg State Parliament under the auspices of the German Völkisch Freedom Party. He would remain a member of this body until his death.

Nazi Party career
In March 1925 Klant re-joined the Nazi Party (membership number 1,065) after the ban on it was lifted, and he founded the Nazi Local Group (Ortsgruppe) in Hamburg, Germany’s second largest city. On 27 March he was proclaimed the first Gauleiter of Gau Hamburg and confirmed in this post by Adolf Hitler on 15 July. He maintained his headquarters in the backrooms of his cigar shop. Klant's Gau was a member of the National Socialist Working Association, a short-lived group of north and northwest German Gaue, organized and led by Gregor Strasser, which unsuccessfully sought to amend the Party program. It was dissolved in 1926 following the Bamberg Conference.

Klant was considered to be in the moderate wing of the Party and opposed the use of force as a tactic against political opponents. He did not succeed in asserting himself against the Sturmabteilung (SA) in Hamburg. Constant quarrels between the SA and the Gau political leadership were the result. In addition, the Party membership remained largely lower middle class and failed to attract sizeable numbers of workers. The membership stagnated and the leadership was factionalized. Klant was increasingly unable to control his subordinates.

In October 1926 Klant offered to resign, hoping that this would be refused thereby strengthening his position in the leadership. Instead, the Party headquarters in Munich sent Strasser, now the national Propaganda Leader, to Hamburg to supervise a total restructuring. On 4 November 1926, Strasser removed Klant as Gauleiter. In addition, Hamburg lost its status as a Gau and was renamed the "Independent Ortsgruppe (Local Group) Hamburg." Strasser oversaw the election of Albert Krebs with the title of Chairman (in effect, Ortsgruppenleiter) of the new organization. Klant protested his removal by appealing to his fellow Gauleiters, but relinquished his challenge when it became clear that Strasser had the full support of Hitler. Klant took no additional active part in party affairs, and died on 7 September 1927 after suffering a stroke. At his funeral in Ohlsdorf Cemetery, Albert Krebs spoke on behalf of the Party.

References

Sources

External links
 

1869 births
1927 deaths
Gauleiters
German National People's Party politicians
German Völkisch Freedom Party politicians
National Socialist Working Association members
Nazi Party officials
People from the Province of Silesia
Politicians from Hamburg